Gaël Hiroux (born 3 August 1980) is a French former professional footballer who played as a forward. He was a member of the France squad that played at the 2001 Mediterranean Games, scoring once against San Marino. At club level, he notably scored two goals in six games to help Paris Saint-Germain win the 2001 UEFA Intertoto Cup.

After football 
Hiroux retired from football in 2008 and later became a commercial agent.

Honours 
Paris Saint-Germain U19

 Coupe Gambardella runner-up: 1997–98

Paris Saint-Germain

 UEFA Intertoto Cup: 2001

France U21

 Mediterranean Games bronze medal: 2001

References

1980 births
Living people
Sportspeople from Versailles, Yvelines
French footballers
INF Clairefontaine players
Paris Saint-Germain F.C. players
FC Martigues players
RFC Liège players
Wasquehal Football players
Red Star F.C. players
GSI Pontivy players
AS Poissy players
ASA Issy players
AC Boulogne-Billancourt players
Association football forwards
Ligue 1 players
Ligue 2 players
French expatriate footballers
Expatriate footballers in Belgium
French expatriate sportspeople in Belgium
France youth international footballers
France under-21 international footballers
Competitors at the 2001 Mediterranean Games
Mediterranean Games bronze medalists for France
Footballers from Yvelines